Yevgeni Ivanovich Yeliseyev (born 25 December 1908 in Moscow; died 21 August 1999 in St. Petersburg) was a Soviet Russian football player and coach.

Honours
 Soviet Top League champion: 1936 (spring), 1937, 1940.
 Soviet Cup winner: 1937.
 Top-33 season best players list: 1930 (#2), 1933 (#3), 1938 (Top-55 / #1).

External links
 

1908 births
Footballers from Moscow
1999 deaths
Soviet footballers
FC Dynamo Moscow players
FC Dinamo Minsk players
Soviet Top League players
Soviet football managers
FC Dinamo Minsk managers
FK Daugava Rīga managers
FC Lokomotiv Moscow managers
FC Zenit Saint Petersburg managers
FC Metalist Kharkiv managers
Pakhtakor Tashkent FK managers
Association football midfielders
Burials at Serafimovskoe Cemetery